The Morane-Saulnier MS.570 was a civil utility aircraft produced in small numbers in France in the late 1940s.

Design and development
The MS.570 was a derivative of the MS.560 aerobatics aircraft with a revised fuselage design that added a second seat side-by-side with the pilot's and a more powerful engine.

Like its predecessor, the MS.570 was a low-wing cantilever monoplane with retractable tricycle undercarriage. Construction was of metal throughout, with the fuselage having a semi-monocoque structure. The cockpit was enclosed by an expansive bubble canopy that slid rearwards to provide access. The wings could be folded for storage.

While the MS.570 had only two seats, it was followed by MS.571 that added an extra seat to the rear of the cockpit (optionally, a small bench seat), and the dedicated four-seater MS.572.

Variants
 MS.570 - two-seat version with Renault 4Pei engine (1 built)
 MS.571 - 3/4-seat version with Renault 4Pei engine (7 built)
 MS.572 - four-version with Potez 4D-01 engine (2 built)

Specifications (MS.571 in three-seat configuration)

Notes

References

Further reading

1940s French civil utility aircraft
MS.570
Low-wing aircraft
Aircraft first flown in 1945